Rilaena triangularis is a species of the harvestman family Phalangiidae. It is sometimes considered to be in the genus Paraplatybunus, in the subfamily Platybuninae.

Description 
Rilaena triangularis is a harvestman that lives across Europe. This species was first described by Johann Friedrich Wilhelm Herbst in 1799. Initially as Phalangium triangularis, but was later renamed through recombination.

Chemical defense 
When disturbed the Rilaena triangularis uses a chemical defence by emitting a strong-smelling secretion. This fluid contains 1,4-Benzoquinone, 1,4-Naphthoquinone and Caprylic acid.

Range 
Occurrences of Rilaena triangularis have been recorded and aggregated in GBIF across Europe, with the exception of Spain and Portugal. It has also been observed in north-west and north-east corners of the United States.

Habitat 
The species thrives in forests, floodplain forests and  fens.

References 

Harvestmen
Articles containing video clips
Animals described in 1799